The Archdiocese or Archbishopric of Arad, formerly the Bishopric of Arad is an episcopal see of the Romanian Orthodox Church, under the administration of the Metropolis of Banat, with jurisdiction over Arad County in Romania. The current head is bishop Timotei Seviciu.

History
 
The history of Eastern Orthodox Christianity on the territory of the present-day bishopric is very long and dates back to late Antiquity and early Middle Ages. The Eparchy of Arad in its modern form was created after the Austro-Turkish war (1683-1699), in 1706 when the city of Arad and its region became part of Habsburg monarchy. During 18th century and up to the middle of 19th century, Bishopric of Arad was under jurisdiction of the Metropolitanate of Karlovci. Eparchy of Arad also had an important regional vicariate (exarchate) in the city of Oradea. Majority of Eastern Orthodox Christians of this Eparchy were ethnic Romanians and minority were ethnic Serbs and Greeks. Following the will of the majority of people, the Eparchy of Arad was transferred in 1865 from jurisdiction of the Patriarchate of Karlovci to the jurisdiction of the newly created Metropolis of Sibiu. The Eastern Orthodox Romanians of the Patriarchate of Karlovci separated and were transferred to the newly created Metropolis of Sibiu through mutual agreement that included the transfer of the Eparchy of Arad and eastern parts of eparchies of Temišvar and Vršac. After World War I and the creation of united Romania, it became part of the united Romanian Orthodox Church. In 2009, the bishopric was elevated to an archbishopric under the Metropolis of Banat.

Bishops
 
Between 1695 and 1865 the bishops were under the jurisdiction of the Metropolitanate of Karlovci.
 Isaija Đaković (1695–1708)
 Joanikije Martinović (1710–21)
 Sofronije Ravaničianin (1722–26)
 Vikentije Jovanović (1726–31)
 Isaija Antonović (1731–48)
 Pavle Nenadović (1748–49)
 Sinesije Živanović (1749–68)
 Pahomije Knežević (1769–83)
 Petar Petrović (1784–86)
 Pavle Avakumović (1786–15)
 Sede vacans (1815–29), administrator Josif Putnik
 Nestor Jovanović (1829–30)
 Gerasim Rac (1835–52)
 Prokopije Ivačković (1853–65)

Since 1865, these bishops have been under the jurisdiction of the Metropolis of Sibiu until 1947 when the Metropolis of Banat was established. In 2009, the holder of the office was elevated to the rank of archbishop.
 
 Prokopije Ivačković (1865–73)
 Miron Romanul (1873–74)
 Ioan Mețianu (1874–98)
 Iosif Ioan Goldiș (1899–1902)
 Ioan Ignatie Papp (1903–25)
 Grigorie Comșa (1925–35)
 Andrei Mageru (1936–60)
 Nicolae Corneanu (1960–62)
 Teoctist Arăpașu (1962–73)
 Visarion Aștileanu (1973–84)
 Timotei Seviciu (1984–present), archbishop since 2009.

See also
 List of members of the Holy Synod of the Romanian Orthodox Church
 Metropolitanate of Karlovci
 Patriarchate of Karlovci

References

Bibliography

External links
 Sources of Historical Demography of XVIIIth century in the Diocese of Arad
 At the limits of the Romanian Orthodoxy: Oradea Vicariate

Arad
Defunct religious sees of the Serbian Orthodox Church